No Love is a 1991 Soviet drama film directed by Valery Rubinchik.

Plot 
The film tells about Rita, who meets with an elderly photographer and a student at the same time, but doesn't really like one of them, which hurts both him and herself.

Cast 
 Kseniya Kachalina
 Stanislav Lyubshin
 Dmitriy Roshchin
 Genrietta Yegorova
 Irina Shelamova
 Yekaterina Shcherbakova		
 Viktor Remizov
 Aleksandr Pozharov

References

External links 
 

1991 films
1990s Russian-language films
Soviet drama films
1991 drama films